The Waldo Theatre is a historic movie theater and performance venue at 916 Main Street in Waldoboro, Maine.  Built in 1936 as a movie theater to a design by New York City architect Benjamin Schlanger, it was hailed at the time as one of the best-designed state-of-the-art small theaters in the country.  It is now managed by a non-profit arts organization.  It was listed on the National Register of Historic Places in 1986.

Description and history
The Waldo Theatre stands on the north side of Waldoboro's downtown Main Street, next door to the former U.S. Customhouse and Post Office.  It is a two-story masonry structure with brick walls, wooden trim, and a gabled roof.  The front has a Classical temple appearance, with four Tuscan columns rising to an entablature and fully pedimented gable.  The gable rake edge and cornice are studded with modillions.  The interior has minimal decoration, with that present suggestive of the Art Deco period.  The theater seats about 400 in the main floor and balcony.

The theater was built in 1936 by the local Cooney family, to a design by New York architect Benjamin Schlanger, who was well known for his theater designs.  Its design features included seats of varying width, as well as some seats fitted for the hearing impaired.  The floor is sloped, and the seats set at a slant, for more comfortable viewing of an elevated screen.  The ventilation system was state of the art, allowing for rapid exchanges of air for climate control.  The theater showed movies through the 1950s, and was then adapted for use by the local Masonic lodge, also seeing some use as a live performance venue.  In the 1980s, the theater was acquired by a non-profit and renovated for live theatrical use,.

See also
National Register of Historic Places listings in Lincoln County, Maine

References

External links 
 Waldo Theatre website

Buildings and structures in Lincoln County, Maine
Theatres in Maine
Tourist attractions in Lincoln County, Maine
National Register of Historic Places in Lincoln County, Maine
Theatres on the National Register of Historic Places in Maine
Waldoboro, Maine